François-Alexandre Verdier (c. 1651 - 1730) was French painter, draftsman and engraver.  
He was a student and assistant of Charles Le Brun.

Biography

François-Alexandre Verdier was born in Paris around 1651.  He studied under Charles Le Brun.
In 1668 he was awarded the 1st prize in drawing at the Royal Academy of Painting and Sculpture.
From 1668 to 1671 he lived in Italy at the Medici Villa.
He won the Prix de Rome for drawing in 1668 for his work Première conquête de la Franche-Comté,
and again in 1671 for Le Roi donnant la paix à l'Europe.
He was admitted to the Academy in 1678.
By 1684 he was a Professor.
He exhibited at the Salon of 1704.
He died in Paris in 1730.

Œuvres 
Many of his drawings and paintings are at the Musée du Louvre.  They include:
 Saint Paulin de Nole, drawing in red with white chalk highlights, 36.5 cm  x 28.5 cm
Le triomphe de la religion, oil on canvas, 53x43cm, Paris, Musée du Louvre.
La Chute des anges rebelles, oil on canvas, 163x134cm, Paris, Musée du Louvre.
A number of his drawings on religious subjects were made into prints by the engraver Nicolas-Henri Tardieu and are now held in the Museum of Fine Arts of Nancy.

Gallery

Citations

Sources

17th-century French painters
French male painters
18th-century French painters
1730 deaths
Year of birth unknown
French draughtsmen
Year of birth uncertain
18th-century French male artists